The Sabah Museum (Malay: Muzium Sabah) is the state museum of Sabah, Malaysia.

History 
The original Sabah Museum location was established on 15 July 1965 in a shophouse in Gaya Street, Kota Kinabalu, largely due to the efforts of the Sabah Society. George Cathcart Woolley collection of photographs, diaries and other artefacts, bequeathed to the State Government of Sabah, formed the nucleus of the museum. The first curator of the museum was E. J. Berwick. The museum administration then came under the State Ministry of Community Services and within the same year in 1981 under the initiative of former Sabah Chief Minister Harris Salleh, a total of RM31.2 million was gathered for the construction of a new museum building with the construction started on 1 June. The following year, the museum administration came under the State Ministry of Culture, Youth and Sports where it finally moved into its present location on 11 April 1984. The new building was officiated on 11 April 1984 by the seventh Yang di-Pertuan Agong, Sultan Ahmad Shah of Pahang through his visit on the state.

Features 
The complex contains not only the museum proper, but also an ethnobotanic garden, a zoo and a heritage village. The main building also houses the Sabah Art Gallery. Other galleries cover Islamic civilisation, archaeology and history, natural history, and ceramics and brassware. The mission of the museum is to collect, preserve, conserve and document ethnographic, archaeological, historical, numismatic, art-historical, botanical, zoological and mineralogical collections from throughout the state, and to conduct research on important and interesting aspects of Sabah's history, culture, and social and natural history.

See also 
 List of museums in Malaysia

References

External links 
 
 

Buildings and structures in Kota Kinabalu
Museums established in 1984
Museums in Sabah